Saint-Martin-du-Tertre may refer to the following places in France:

 Saint-Martin-du-Tertre, Yonne, a commune in the Yonne department
 Saint-Martin-du-Tertre, Val-d'Oise, a commune in the Val-d'Oise department

See also
 Saint-Martin-du-Tartre, a commune in the Saône-et-Loire department